The 1993 Pacific Lutheran Lutes football team was an American football team that represented Pacific Lutheran University in the Columbia Football Association (CFA) during the 1993 NAIA Division II football season. In their 22nd season under head coach Frosty Westering, the Lutes compiled a 12–0–1 record and won the NAIA Division II national championship.

The team played its five home games at Sparks Stadium in Puyallup, Washington, and also played three of its games (including two playoff games) at Tacoma, Washington, located 10 miles to the northwest of Puyallup.

Coach Westering won four national championships at Pacific Lutheran (1980, 1987, 1993, and 1999) and was inducted into the College Football Hall of Fame in 2005.

Schedule

References

Pacific Lutheran
Pacific Lutheran Lutes football seasons
NAIA Football National Champions
College football undefeated seasons
Pacific Lutheran Lutes football